Grodno or Hrodna is a city in western Belarus. In 2019, the city had 373,547 inhabitants. Grodno is the administrative center of Grodno Region and Grodno District.

Other names

History

The modern city of Grodno originated as a small fortress and a fortified trading outpost maintained by the Rurikid princes on the border with the lands of the Baltic tribal union of the Yotvingians. The first reference to Grodno dates to 1005.

The official foundation year is 1127. In this year Grodno was mentioned in the Primary Chronicle as Goroden and located at a crossing of numerous trading routes

Along with Navahrudak, Grodno was regarded as the main city on the western borderlands of Black Ruthenia. The border region neighboured the Grand Duchy of Lithuania. It was often attacked by various invaders, especially the Teutonic Knights. In the 1240–1250s the Grodno area, as well as the most of Black Ruthenia, was controlled by princes of Lithuanian origin (Mindaugas and others) to form the Baltic state—Grand Duchy of Lithuania—on these territories, which since 1385 formed part of the Polish–Lithuanian union. After the Prussian uprisings a large population of Old Prussians sought refuge in the region. The famous Lithuanian Grand Duke Vytautas was the prince of Grodno from 1376 to 1392, and he stayed there during his preparations for the Battle of Grunwald (1410). Since 1413, Grodno had been the administrative center of a powiat in Trakai Voivodeship.

Polish–Lithuanian Commonwealth

To aid the reconstruction of trade and commerce, the grand dukes allowed the creation of a Jewish commune in 1389. It was one of the first Jewish communities in the grand duchy. In 1441 the city received its charter, based on the Magdeburg Law.

As an important centre of trade, commerce, and culture, Grodno was a notable royal city and was also one of the royal residences and political centers of the Polish–Lithuanian Commonwealth. The Old and New Castles were often visited by the Commonwealth monarchs including famous Stephen Báthory of Poland who made a royal residence there. Kings Casimir IV Jagiellon and Stephen Báthory died there. Grodno was one of the places where the Sejms of the Polish–Lithuanian Commonwealth were held, incl. the last Sejm in the history of the Commonwealth in 1793.

The city was the site of two battles, Battle of Grodno (1706) and Battle of Grodno (1708) during the Great Northern War.

After the Second Partition of the Polish–Lithuanian Commonwealth and a subsequent administrative reform of the remainder of the Commonwealth, Grodno became the capital of the short-lived Grodno Voivodeship in 1793.

In 1795, Russia annexed the city in the Third Partition of Poland. It was in the New Castle on 25 November that year that the last Polish king and Lithuanian grand duke Stanisław August Poniatowski abdicated. In the Russian Empire, the city continued to serve its role as a seat of Grodno Governorate since 1801. The industrial activities started in the late 18th century by Antoni Tyzenhaus, continued to develop.

Count Aleksander Bisping was arrested and imprisoned here during the January Uprising (1863-1864) before his exile to Ufa.

Like many other cities in Eastern Europe, Grodno had a significant Jewish population before the Holocaust: according to Russian census of 1897, out of the total population of 46,900, Jews constituted 22,700 (around 48%, or almost half of the total population).

World War I and interwar Poland

After the outbreak of World War I, Grodno was occupied by Germany (3 September 1915) and ceded by Bolshevist Russia under the Treaty of Brest-Litovsk in 1918. After the war the German government permitted a short-lived state to be set up there, the first one with a Belarusian name—the Belarusian People's Republic. This declared its independence from Russia in March 1918 in Minsk (known at that time as Mensk), but then the BNR's Rada (Council) had to leave Minsk and fled to Grodno. All this time the military authority in the city remained in German hands.

After the outbreak of the Polish–Bolshevik War, the German commanders of the Ober Ost feared that the city might fall to Soviet Russia, so on 27 April 1919 they passed authority to Poland, which just regained independence several months earlier. The city was taken over by the Polish Army the following day and Polish administration was established in the city. The city was lost to the Red Army on 20 July 1920 in what became known as the First Battle of Grodno. The city was also claimed by Lithuanian government, after it was agreed by the Soviet–Lithuanian Treaty of 1920 signed on 12 July 1920 in Moscow that the city would be transferred to Lithuania. However, Soviet defeat in the Battle of Warsaw made these plans obsolete, and Lithuanian authority was never established in the city. Instead, the Red Army organised its last stand in the city and the Battle of Neman took place there. On  the Polish Army recaptured the city. After the Peace Treaty of Riga, Grodno remained in Poland.

Initially, prosperity was reduced due to the fact that the city remained only the capital of a powiat, while the capital of the voivodeship was moved to Białystok. However, in the late 1920s the city became one of the biggest Polish Army garrisons. This brought the local economy back on track. Also, the city was a notable centre of Jewish culture, with roughly 37% of the city's population being Jewish, while Poles constituted 60% of the inhabitants of Grodno.

World War II

During the Polish Defensive War of September to October 1939 the garrison of Grodno was mostly used for the formation of numerous military units fighting against the invading Wehrmacht. In the course of the Soviet invasion of Poland (initiated on 17 September 1939) heavy fighting took place in the city between Soviet and improvised Polish forces, composed mostly of march battalions and volunteers. In the course of the Battle of Grodno  the Red Army lost some hundred men (according to Polish sources; according to Soviet sources – 57 killed and 159 wounded) and also 19 tanks and 4 APCs destroyed or damaged. The Polish side suffered at least 100 killed in action, military and civil, but losses still remain uncertain in detail (Soviet sources claim 644 killed and 1543 captives with many guns and machine guns etc. captured). Over 300 captured Polish defenders of the city, including Polish Army officers and youth, were massacred afterwards by the Soviets. After the Soviet forces surrounded the engaged Polish units, the escaping Polish units withdrew to Lithuania.

In accordance with the Molotov–Ribbentrop Pact of August 1939, the city was occupied by the Soviet Union and annexed into the Byelorussian Soviet Socialist Republic. Several thousand of the city's Polish inhabitants were deported to remote areas of the Soviet Union. On 23 June 1941 the city came under German occupation that lasted until 16 July 1944. It was administered as part of the Bialystok District. Surviving inmates of the Grodno prison were released and the scale of the NKVD prisoner massacres revealed.
In the course of Operation Barbarossa in World War II, the majority of Jews were herded by the Nazis into the Grodno Ghetto and subsequently killed in extermination camps. The Germans also operated a Nazi prison in the city.

Since 1945, the city has been a centre of one of the provinces of the Byelorussian SSR, now of the independent Republic of Belarus. Most of the Polish inhabitants were expelled or fled to Poland in 1944–1946 and 1955–1959. However nowadays Poles are still the second-most numerous nationality in the city (25%), after Belarusians (60%).

Jewish community
Jews began to settle in Grodno in the 14th century after the approval given to them by the Lithuanian Grand Duke Vytautas. During the next years, their status had changed several times and in 1495 the Jews were deported from the city and banned from settling in Grodno (the ban was lifted in 1503). In 1560 there were 60 Jewish families in Grodno. They were concentrated on the "Jewish street" with their own synagogue and "hospital". In the year 1578 the great synagogue of Grodno was built by rabbi Mordehai Yaffe (Baal ha-Levush). The synagogue was severely damaged in a fire in 1599.

The community was not affected by the Khmelnytsky uprising but suffered during the 1655 Cossack uprising and during the war with Sweden (1703–1708). After Grodno was annexed by the Russian Empire in 1795 the Jewish population continued to grow and in 1907 there were 25,000 Jews out of a total population of 47,000.

In the period of independent Poland, a yeshiva had operated in the city (Shaar ha-Tora) under the management of Rabbi Shimon Shkop. Before the German-Soviet invasion of Poland there were about 25,000 Jews in Grodno out of 50,000 total population. During the German occupation of the city, on 1 November 1942 the Jews were concentrated in 2 ghettos. 15,000 men were confined to the old part of the city where the main synagogue was located. A high wall of 2 meters was built around the ghetto. The second ghetto was located in the Slovodka part of the city with 10,000 inhabitants. The head of the Judenrat was appointed Dr. Braur (or Brawer), the school's headmaster, who served in this duty until his execution in February 1943 during a roundup for a deportation to Treblinka. Several local Jews were rescued by Poles who either hidden them in the city or transported them to other locations.

On 2 November 1942 the deportations to the death camps began and during 5 days in February 1943, 10,000 Jews were sent to Auschwitz. Later, on 13 February, 5,000 Jews were sent to Treblinka. During the deportations, many synagogues were looted and some people were murdered. The last Jews were deported in March 1943. By the end of the war, only one Jew had remained in the ghetto. However, a few hundred survived in the camps or in hiding in the area.  Perhaps as many as 2000 survived, including those who fled or were deported to the USSR.

After the war, the Jewish community was revived. Most of the Jews emigrated after the collapse of the Soviet Union. Today there are several hundred Jews in the city with most of the community's activity centralized in the main synagogue that had been returned to the community by the authorities in the 1990s. The head of the community is Rabbi Yitzhak Kaufman.

A memorial plaque, commemorating the 25,000 Jews who were exterminated in the two ghettos in the city of Grodno was placed on a building in Zamkavaja vulica, where the entrance to the ghetto once was.

Geography
The following rivers flow through the city: the Neman River, the Lasosna River and the Haradničanka River with its branch the Yurysdyka River.

Climate
The Köppen Climate Classification subtype for this climate is "Dfb" (Warm Summer Continental Climate).

Modern city

The city has one of the largest concentrations of Roman Catholics in Belarus. It is also a centre of Polish culture, with a significant number of Poles living in Belarus residing in the city and its surroundings.

The Eastern Orthodox population is also widely present. The city's Catholic and Orthodox churches are important architectural treasures.

The city houses the Grodno State Medical University where many students from different parts of Belarus acquire academic degrees, as do a number of foreign students. Other higher educational establishments are Yanka Kupala State University of Grodno (the largest education centre in Grodno Province) and Grodno State Agrarian University. To support the Polish community, a Polish school was built in 1995, where all subjects are taught in Polish and students are able to pass exams to get accepted into Polish universities.

Architecture
The town was planned to be dominated by the Old Grodno Castle, first built in stone by Grand Duke Vytautas and thoroughly rebuilt in the Renaissance style by Scotto from Parma at the behest of Stefan Batory, who made the castle his principal residence. Batory died at this palace seven years later (December 1586) and originally was interred in Grodno. (His autopsy there was the first to take place in Eastern Europe.) After his death, the castle was altered on numerous occasions, although a 17th-century stone arch bridge linking it with the city still survives. The Wettin monarchs of Poland were dissatisfied with the old residence and commissioned Matthäus Daniel Pöppelmann to design the New Grodno Castle, whose once sumptuous Baroque interiors were destroyed during World War II.

Medieval

The oldest extant structure in Grodno is the Kalozha Church of Sts. Boris and Gleb (Belarusian: Каложская царква). It is the only surviving monument of ancient Black Ruthenian architecture, distinguished from other Orthodox churches by prolific use of polychrome faceted stones of blue, green or red tint which could be arranged to form crosses or other figures on the wall.

The church was built before 1183 and survived intact until 1853, when the south wall collapsed, due to its perilous location on the high bank of the Neman. During restoration works, some fragments of 12th-century frescos were discovered in the apses. Remains of four other churches in the same style, decorated with pitchers and coloured stones instead of frescos, were discovered in Grodno and Vaŭkavysk. They all date back to the turn of the 13th century, as do remains of the first stone palace in the Old Castle.

Baroque

The Cathedral of St. Francis Xavier stands on Batory Square (now: Soviet Square). The cathedral was a Jesuit church until 1773. This specimen of high Baroque architecture, exceeding 50 metres in height, was started in 1678. Due to wars that rocked Poland-Lithuania at that time, the cathedral was consecrated only 27 years later, in the presence of Peter the Great and Augustus the Strong. Its late Baroque frescoes were executed in 1752.

The extensive grounds of the Bernardine monastery (1602–18), renovated in 1680 and 1738, display all the styles flourishing in the 17th century, from Gothic to Baroque. The interior is considered a masterpiece of so-called Vilnius Baroque. Other monastic establishments include the old Franciscan cloister (1635), Basilian convent (1720–51, by Giuseppe Fontana III), the church of the Bridgettine cloister (1642, one of the earliest Baroque buildings in the region) with the wooden two-storey dormitory (1630s) still standing on the grounds, and the 18th-century buildings of the Dominican monastery (its cathedral was demolished in 1874).

Other sights in Grodno include the Orthodox cathedral, a polychrome Russian Revival extravaganza from 1904; the botanical garden, the first in the Polish–Lithuanian Commonwealth, founded in 1774; a curiously curved building on the central square (1780s); a 254-metre-high TV tower (1984); and Stanisławów, a summer residence of the last Polish king.

Transport

The city is served by Grodno Airport located 18 km south-east of Grodno. Some seasonal international and charter flights are available throughout the year.

The city's public transport includes trolleybuses, which began operating in Grodno on 5 November 1974. The trolleybus system is operated by the city, and in 2009 it had 12 routes and carried around 66.5 million passengers per year. Additional routes have been opened subsequently, including routes 21 and 22 in November 2019.

Sport

The main sport venues of the city are:
Neman Stadium official CSC Nyoman (8800 seats), based teams: FC Neman Grodno, FHC Ritm (Grodno);
Grodno Ice Sports Palace (2539 seats), 
based teams: HC Neman Grodno, HC Neman Grodno;
Grodno Indoor ice rink in Pyshki;
Sport complex "Viktoryya", based teams: basketball club Grodno-93, women basketball club Alimpiya, handball club Kronan, women handball club Haradnichanka

Education
Yanka Kupala State University of Grodno 
Grodno State Medical University
Grodno State Agrarian University
Grodno Higher Theological Seminary
There are also 41 middleschools (or secondary schools) in Grodno.

Culture

In 21 club municipal office more than 220 collectives, circles and also studios of amateur performances work. In them about 6500 children and adults are engaged. From 83 on-stage performance groups the rank "national" is carried 39, "exemplary" — 43, "professional" — 1.

Since 1996 the biggest in Belarus Festival of National Cultures is hold in Grodno Every two years the Festival of National Cultures invites many guests into the city.

Various festivals, national holidays and ceremonies are held annually in Grodno, among them "Student's spring", an international celebration of piano music or the republican festival of theatrical youth.

In 2001 the Grodno regional executive committee founded Alexander Dubko's award — the governor of Grodnenshchina — for the best creative achievements in the sphere of culture. 84 persons have been awarded this prize.

Visa-free entrance to Grodno
From 26 October 2016 residents of 77 countries can travel to Grodno and the Grodno District without a visa and stay there for up to 10 days.

Notable people
 Born in the town
 David of Grodno (died 1326), one of the famous military commander of Gediminas, Grand Duke of Lithuania
 January Suchodolski (1797–1875), Polish painter and Army officer
 Zygmunt Wróblewski (1845–1888), Polish physicist and chemist
 Moisey Ostrogorsky (1854–1921), political scientist, co-founder of political sociology
 Bronisław Bohatyrewicz (1870–1940), Polish General, murdered in the Katyn Massacre
 Juliusz Rómmel (1881–1967), Polish military officer, General of the Polish Army
 Karol Rómmel (1888–1967), Polish military officer and sportsman
 Anton Gretzky (1892-1973), Polish-born grandfather of ice hockey player Wayne Gretzky
 Helena Antipoff (1892-1974), Russian-born Brazilian psychologist. 
 Anne Azgapetian (born 1888), nurse during World War I, fundraiser for Armenian relief causes
 Aleksei Antonov (1896–1962), Chief of the General Staff of the Soviet Army from February 1945
 David Rubinoff (1897–1986), American violinist
 Meyer Lansky (1902–1983), central figure in the Jewish Mafia and highly influential figure in the Italian Mafia
 Herman Yablokoff (1903–1981), Jewish American actor, singer, composer, poet, playwright, director and producer
 Henryk Hlebowicz (1904–1941), Polish Diocesan Priest (Blessed)
 Chaim Dov Rabinowitz (1909–2001), Hebrew rabbi noted for his commentary on the Hebrew Bible
 Zelik Epstein (1914–2009), prominent Orthodox Rabbi and head of a yeshiva
 Eitan Livni (1919–1991), Israeli politician, Irgun activist and father of Tzipi Livni
 Kanstantsin Lukashyk (born 1975), shooter who became the youngest gold medalist in shooting during the 1992 Olympics
 Paul Baran (1926–2011), Internet pioneer and technology entrepreneur
 (1927–1996), Polish poet and author
 Jerzy Maksymiuk (born 1936), Polish musician and director
 Alaksandar Milinkievič (born 1947), Belarusian politician, candidate in the 2006 presidential elections
 Olga Korbut (born 1955), gymnast and four-time gold medallist at 1972 and 1976 Olympic Games
 Valery Levaneuski (born 1963), entrepreneur, politician and former political prisoner
 Valery Tsepkalo (born 1965), diplomat and executive, founder of Belarus Hi-Tech Park.
 Alexander Butko (born 1986), Olympic volleyball player
 Andrey Ashyhmin (born 1974), footballer
 Pavel Savitski (born 1994), footballer
 Sergey Grinevich (born 1960) Belarusian painter.
 Dzianis Ivashyn (born 1979), Belarusian journalist and political prisoner
 Active in Grodno
 Vytautas the Great (1350–1430), Grand Duke of Lithuania, commander of the forces of the Grand Duchy in the Battle of Grunwald
 Antoni Tyzenhaus (1733–1785), starost of Grodno, founder of numerous factories in the area
 Jean-Emmanuel Gilibert (1741–1814), French medic, botanist and biologist
 L. L. Zamenhof (1859–1917), Polish physician, creator of Esperanto
 Pyotr Stolypin (1862–1911) in 1903 as a governor
 Maksim Bahdanovič (1891–1917), a Belarusian poet, journalist and literary critic.
 Józef Olszyna-Wilczyński (1890–1939), Polish general, commander of the military region, murdered nearby by the Soviets
 Jan Kochanowski, a Polish creator of the local ZOO, murdered by the Nazis
 Paweł Jasienica (1909–1970), a Polish historian and author, started his career as a history teacher in Grodno in the 1920s and 1930s
 Vasil’ Bykaw (1924–2003), a Belarusian author
 Solomon Perel (1925–2023), a German Jew who survived World War II by masquerading as an ethnic German. He spent two years at a Komsomol-run orphanage in Grodno, before Operation Barbarossa
 Czesław Niemen (1939–2004), Polish musician, composer and one of the pioneers of progressive rock studied at a local music school
 Andżelika Borys (born 1973), former leader of Grodno-based Union of Poles in Belarus
 Died in Grodno
 Casimir IV Jagiellon (1427–1492), King of Poland and Grand Duke of Lithuania
 Saint Casimir (1458–1484), Roman Catholic saint and the patron saint of Lithuania
 Stephen Báthory (1533–1586), King of Poland and Grand Duke of Lithuania
 Alexander Süsskind of Grodno (died 1794), Kabbalist
 Nachum Kaplan (1811–1879), preacher and philanthropist
 Eliza Orzeszkowa (1841–1910), Polish writer, born nearby and active in Grodno

International relations

Twin towns - sister cities
Grodno is twinned with:

 Alytus, Lithuania
 Ashkelon, Israel
 Cheboksary, Russia
 Druskininkai, Lithuania
 Dzerzhinsk, Russia
 Khimki, Russia
 Kraljevo, Serbia
 Lazdijai, Lithuania
 Limoges, France
 Minden, Germany
 Qabala District, Azerbaijan
 Rancho Cordova, United States
 Shchukino District (Moscow), Russia
 Tambov, Russia
 Tuapsinsky District, Russia
 Vologda, Russia
 Žilina, Slovakia

Former twin towns:
 Augustów, Poland
 Białystok, Poland
 Słupsk, Poland

In March 2022, the Polish cities of Augustów, Białystok and Słupsk terminated their partnership with Grodno as a consequence of Belarus's involvement in the 2022 Russian invasion of Ukraine.

Significant depictions in popular culture
 Grodno is one of the starting towns of Lithuania in the turn-based strategy game Medieval II: Total War: Kingdoms.
 Grodno is a location for one of the missions in the alternate history RTS Command and Conquer: Red Alert; Grodno was part of the Soviet Union and the Allied forces must work to rescue a special operative before her execution in a Soviet military base.

See also
 Battle of Grodno (1939)
 Disputed territories of Baltic States
 List of early East Slavic states
 Gordon (disambiguation)
 Great Synagogue (Grodno)
 Grodno Ghetto

References

Further reading
Published in the 18th–19th centuries

Published in the 20th century

External links

  Hrodna Region: The Land of Catholics and Smugglers
  Grodno in the Geographical Dictionary of the Kingdom of Poland (1881)
 (Belarus) Grodno Municipal Government website  
 (Belarus)  "Вечерний Гродно" newspaper published in Russian and Belarusian
 (Belarus) Street map of Grodno
 (Belarus)  Grodno Zoological Park
 

  
Cities in Belarus
Populated places in Grodno Region
Trakai Voivodeship
Grodnensky Uyezd
Białystok Voivodeship (1919–1939)
Belastok Region
Magdeburg rights
Articles containing video clips
Holocaust locations in Belarus
Jewish communities destroyed in the Holocaust